Carroll Hubbard Jr. (July 7, 1937 – November 12, 2022) was an American politician and attorney from Kentucky. He began his political career in the Kentucky Senate, and was elected to the United States House of Representatives in 1974. He served until he was defeated in 1992, after becoming embroiled in the House banking scandal, and ultimately spent two years in prison. After being released, Hubbard ran unsuccessfully for the Kentucky General Assembly on four occasions.

Hubbard was a Democrat during his time in elected office, but he switched to the Republican Party in the last years of his life.

Education and military service 
Hubbard was born on July 7, 1937 in Murray, Kentucky to Dr. Carroll Hubbard, Sr., a Baptist minister, and Beth Hubbard, an elementary school teacher. The family moved several times during his youth, including to Beaver Dam, Kentucky and then Ashland, Kentucky. In 1953, the family moved to Louisville, Kentucky, when his father became pastor of St. Matthews Baptist Church. In Louisville, Mr. Hubbard attended Eastern High School and graduated in 1955.

After high school, Hubbard attended Georgetown College in Georgetown, Kentucky. At Georgetown, he was editor-in-chief of The Georgetonian, a weekly college newspaper. He was a member of the Kappa Alpha Order and served as its President of the fraternity during his senior year. During his senior year at Georgetown, Mr. Hubbard was selected as “Mr. Georgetonian.”

After graduating from Georgetown College with a degree in sociology in 1959, Mr. Hubbard attended the University of Louisville Law School, where he received a full scholarship. In 1967, he was elected to serve in the Kentucky Senate. He graduated from the United States Air Force School of Aerospace Medicine at Brooks Air Force Base in Texas in November 1962 and served in the Kentucky Air National Guard from 1962–67, where he became a captain. He also served in the Kentucky Army National Guard from 1968 to 1970, where he became a captain. He moved to Mayfield, Kentucky where he practiced law for several years.

U.S. House of Representatives
In May 1974, Mr. Hubbard, then a State Senator, defeated incumbent Congressman Frank Stubblefield in the Democratic primary election to represent Kentucky’s First District in the United States Congress. Mr. Hubbard then won the general election in November 1974 and began serving in Congress in Washington, D.C. in January 1975.

As one of 75 freshmen members of the 94th Congress, Mr. Hubbard was elected as president of this large freshman class of new U.S. Representatives. Mr. Hubbard was reelected to Congress in the elections of 1976, 1978, 1980, 1982, 1984, 1986, 1988, and 1990, serving the people of the First District of Kentucky for 18 years in Washington, D.C.

While in Congress, Mr. Hubbard was a member of the House Banking, Finance and Urban Affairs Committee and House Merchant Marine and Fisheries Committee. In addition to his office at the Rayburn House Office Building in Washington, Mr. Hubbard maintained district offices in Madisonville, Henderson, Hopkinsville and Paducah, Kentucky and travelled back to Kentucky from Washington nearly every weekend, where he participated in hundreds of community meetings and events, gave countless speeches, and shook an immeasurable number of hands.

Correspondence with the district’s constituents also took up much of Mr. Hubbard’s time during his days in Congress. In this era before e-mail and social media, Mr. Hubbard personally signed and sent literally hundreds of thousands of letters, newsletters, calendars and Christmas cards to the citizens of Western Kentucky.

Hubbard served in Congress for 18 years, during which he mounted an unsuccessful primary challenge for Governor of Kentucky in 1979.

In 1983, Hubbard was invited to South Korea to attend a celebration of the 30th anniversary of the United States–South Korea Mutual Defense Treaty with three fellow members of Congress, including Larry McDonald and Senator Jesse Helms. Hubbard and Helms planned to meet with McDonald to discuss how to join McDonald on the Korean Air Lines Flight 007. However, as the delays mounted, instead of joining McDonald, Hubbard at the last minute gave up on the trip, canceled his reservations, and accepted a Kentucky speaking engagement. The flight was later shot down by the Soviet Union killing all passengers and crew.

Rubbergate 
Hubbard lost his 1992 re-election bid in the Democratic primary to Thomas Barlow after becoming one of a number of Representatives embroiled in the "Rubbergate" House banking scandal. After he pleaded guilty to violations of federal campaign finance laws, Hubbard served two years in prison from 1995 to 1997. His wife Carol Brown Hubbard, was convicted of using her husband's congressional aides to work on her failed campaign for Congress. She was sentenced to five years' probation.

Hubbard served as an FBI informant, codenamed Elmer Fudd, in an attempt to reduce his sentence.  He was disbarred because of his conviction but was reinstated by the Kentucky Supreme Court in 2001 because of his "good moral character", despite the Kentucky Bar Association's board of governors voting unanimously against reinstatement.

Later career
In 2019, while working on a case, Hubbard mailed a photograph of the opposing counsel and her wife with a homophobic slur written on it. The fallout from that incident resulted in five counts of misconduct including lying under oath about the incident. The Kentucky Supreme Court suspended him from the practice of law for sixty days. Later that year, Hubbard was found to be practicing law without a license as he had failed to complete the continuing education credits associated with the suspension. Hubbard was ultimately permanently disbarred as a consequence of the incident, becoming the third lawyer in Kentucky history to be disbarred more than once.

Post-congressional campaigns
In 2006 and 2008, Hubbard was unsuccessful in attempts to seek election to the Kentucky Senate. He lost by 58 votes in the 2006 race.  He mounted a third and final unsuccessful bid in 2012.

Hubbard announced in 2019 that he was changing his party affiliation to Republican, expressing disagreement with "ultra liberal" positions in the Democratic Party.

In January 2020, he filed to run for the Kentucky House of Representatives against Republican incumbent Steven Rudy. Hubbard lost the primary to Rudy by a wide margin. Rudy subsequently faced Democratic candidate Corbin Snardon in the general election.

Personal life and death
Hubbard was married twice and had two daughters. He died at a nursing home in Paducah, Kentucky, on November 12, 2022, at age 85.

See also
List of American federal politicians convicted of crimes
List of federal political scandals in the United States

References

External links

1937 births
2022 deaths
20th-century American lawyers
20th-century American politicians
21st-century American lawyers
American people convicted of campaign finance violations
Candidates in the 2006 United States elections
Candidates in the 2008 United States elections
Candidates in the 2012 United States elections
Candidates in the 2020 United States elections
Democratic Party members of the United States House of Representatives from Kentucky
Eastern High School (Louisville, Kentucky) alumni
Georgetown College (Kentucky) alumni
Kentucky lawyers
Kentucky National Guard personnel
Kentucky Republicans
Kentucky politicians convicted of crimes
Kentucky state senators
People from Murray, Kentucky
Military personnel from Kentucky
Paul G. Blazer High School alumni
United States Air Force officers
United States Army officers
University of Louisville School of Law alumni